Sigaus homerensis is a grasshopper endemic to the southern South Island of New Zealand. It is known only from three isolated populations in Fiordland.

Distribution and habitat
The distribution of S. homerensis is not known to overlap with that of any other grasshopper species and it is known only from the Earl Mountains. S. homerensis is one of three known alpine grasshoppers found in Fiordland, the other species being Alpinacris tumidicauda and Sigaus takahe.
Known sites of S. homerensis are regularly swept clear of tall plants by avalanches, making these areas more sparsely vegetated than the surrounding. Similar terrain and vegetation is found outside the known distribution, however, S. homerensis are not found in these areas. A possible explanation of this could be associated with avalanches, vegetation height and sunshine hours. This region receives high rainfall (about 8000 mm/year) coupled with the lowest sunshine hours in New Zealand (1400 to 1600 h/year). It appears that these small cleared areas are better for S. homerensis than avalanche-free areas with their taller vegetation. New Zealand Acrididae are diurnal sun-baskers and require basking surface to become active for the day.

Species description
The wings on S. homerensis are micropterous (small wings) between  making this species flightless like most of New Zealand grasshoppers. Male body length ; Female body length .

Type information
Morris, S.J. 2003: Two new species of Sigaus from Fiordland, New Zealand (Orthoptera: Acrididae). New Zealand entomologist, 26: 65–74. PDF
Type locality: Homer Tunnel, Fiordland. 
Type specimen: Male; 28 February 2003; Simon J Morris; Holotype is deposited in the Canterbury Museum, Christchurch and Paratype are deposited in the Canterbury Museum, Christchurch and Otago Museum, Dunedin.

Polymorphism
Two colour morphs are known for adults S. homerensis, 'Drab gold' and 'Dark blue-grey'. Approximately two-thirds of the adults S. homerensis are of the 'Drab Gold' colour morph.

References

External links 

 Sigaus homerensis discussed on RNZ Critter of the Week, 26 April 2019

Acrididae of New Zealand
Endemic fauna of New Zealand
Insects described in 2003
Acrididae
Endemic insects of New Zealand